Lyncina leucodon is a species of sea snail, a cowry, a marine gastropod mollusk in the family Cypraeidae, the cowries.

Description
The White-toothed Cowry was known from only two specimens until rather recently (one in the National Museum of London, England and one in the Harvard University Museum of Comparative Zoology). The distinctiveness of the shell was easily enough to consider it a new species. In the late 1960s and early 1970s the third and fourth specimens were found. By the 1980s, they were being found with regular frequency and were available on the market for about $5000. By 2000, they were common enough to be available for about $1500 in gem state and less than $1000 for lower quality specimens. The color of the White-toothed Cowry varies from a chocolate-brown to butterscotch with whitish spots of varying size and contrast. The dorsal mantle stripe is very distinctive to the species. A number of subspecies and forms have been described including: leucodon (pyriform nominate); angioyna (slight tooth differences); tenuidon (smaller, heavily spotted and rounder); and escotoi (small, dark and very round).

Distribution

References

 Poppe G.T. (2004) Descriptions of spectacular new species from the Philippines (Gastropoda - Trochidae, Cypraeidae). Visaya 1(1): 4–19.

External links

Cypraeidae
Gastropods described in 1832